Heide Rühle (born 5 November 1948, in Heilbronn) is a German politician and former Member of the European Parliament for Alliance '90/The Greens, part of the European Greens.

References

1948 births
Living people
Alliance 90/The Greens MEPs
MEPs for Germany 1999–2004
MEPs for Germany 2004–2009
MEPs for Germany 2009–2014
20th-century women MEPs for Germany
21st-century women MEPs for Germany
Recipients of the Cross of the Order of Merit of the Federal Republic of Germany
Recipients of the Order of Merit of Baden-Württemberg